CharaChorder is an American privately held company that specializes in text input devices. Its major products include the CharaChorder One and the CharaChorder Lite, which are keyboards that allow for character and chorded entry.

History 
The company's first product was the CharaChorder One.  The intention of this first device was to assist people with disabilities and those with limited mobility the ability to communicate with ease.
The founders cite their creation as an example of the curb cut effect, that is technology designed to enable people with disabilities that leads to benefits for everyone.  After its initial release, the company was recognized as a new and noteworthy company at the consumer electronics show.

In January 2022, the company made the news when its CEO posted videos to social media demonstrating himself typing in excess of 500 wpm.  The speeds are not recorded by some typing competition websites because they are not achieved with a traditional keyboard. In particular, the website monkeytype blocks any speeds over 300 wpm from their leader boards. 

Since its initial creation the company has focused on creation of technologies that enable users to preform text entry faster.  The company's motto is "typing at the speed of thought."  In May 2022, the company began publicly selling the CharaChorder Lite.  The CharaChorder Lite is a chorded keyboard that allows for much of the same functionality of a CharaChorder One, with a more familiar qwerty layout.  In November 2022 the company began a Kickstarter campaign to fund the development of the CharaChorder X, a usb device that aims to bring chorded functionality to existing keyboards.

References 

Companies based in Frisco, Texas
Technology companies of the United States
Electronics companies of the United States
Computer peripheral companies
Computer keyboard companies
Typing
2019 establishments in Texas